China, as the Republic of China, attended the Summer Olympic Games for the first time at the 1924 Summer Olympics in Paris, France. Far Eastern Games Chinese Competition Committee sent 4 tennis players, Khoo Hooi-Hye, Ng Sze-Kwang, Wei Wing-Lock, and Wu Sze-Cheung to sign up for the tennis competition, with Wei Wing-Lock being the team's captain. The delegation even attended the opening ceremony, but later withdrew from the tennis competition. Nevertheless, this is the first appearance of Chinese people at an Olympic venue.

Tennis 

The following players:
 No. 50 , also known as Ng Sze-Kwang
 No. 19 , also known as Wei Wing-Lock()
 No. 64 , also known as Khoo Hooi-Hye
 No. 39 , also known as Wu Sze-Cheung

Notes

References 

1924
Nations at the 1924 Summer Olympics
Summer Olympics